Edward VI of Ireland may refer to:
 Edward VI of England (1537–1553), king of Ireland from 1547
 Lambert Simnel (c. 1477 – c. 1525), imposter to the throne of England who was proclaimed Edward VI in Ireland